Baree is a rural locality in the Rockhampton Region, Queensland, Australia.

Geography 
The Burnett Highway runs along the south-eastern boundary.

History 
The name Baree is thought to be an Aboriginal word meaning either crooked (winding) creek or timber.

Calliungal North State School opened in April 1904, closing in 1929. In 1933 it reopened, closing finally in 1971.

Baree Post Office opened by 1917 (a receiving office had been open from around 1901) and closed in 1975.

Heritage listings
Baree has a number of heritage-listed sites, including:
 Creek Street: Baree School of Arts

Education 
There are no schools in Baree. The nearest government primary and secondary schools are Mount Morgan State School and Mount Morgan State High School, both in neighbouring Mount Morgan to the south-east.

References

Suburbs of Rockhampton Region
Localities in Queensland